"Funky Tonight" is the first single by the John Butler Trio from their fourth studio album, Grand National. It was released in December, 2006, on Jarrah Records.  The song blends funk, roots, blues, and rock. The cover art for the single was designed by Tom Walker.

The song was performed at the ARIA Music Awards of 2007 with special guest Keith Urban, which was then released as a digital download, debuting at number 11 on the ARIA Singles Chart on 12 November 2007.

The video for "Funky Tonight" was directed by Damon Escott and Stephen Lance.

Track listing
All tracks written by John Butler

Charts

Personnel
 John Butler – 12-string guitar, 6-string nylon guitar, banjo, harmonica, vocals
 Shannon Birchall – double bass, electric bass, vocals
 Michael Barker – drums, percussion, vocals
 Danielle Caruana – backing vocals on "Good As Gone"

References

2006 singles
John Butler Trio songs
Songs written by John Butler (musician)